Examined Life is a 2008 Canadian documentary film directed by Astra Taylor about philosophers. The film has eight influential modern philosophers walking around New York and other metropolises, discussing the practical application of their ideas in modern culture.

Featured philosophers
The philosophers are Cornel West, Avital Ronell, Peter Singer, Kwame Anthony Appiah, Martha Nussbaum, Michael Hardt, Slavoj Žižek and Judith Butler, who is accompanied by Taylor's sister and the disability activist Sunny (Sunaura Taylor).

Production and release
The film appeared in the 2008 Toronto International Film Festival, the 2009 Melbourne International Film Festival and the 2009 Kingston Canadian Film Festival. It was co-produced by Sphinx Productions and the National Film Board of Canada, in association with the Ontario Media Development Corporation, TVOntario and Knowledge Network.

Reception
Reception has been generally favorable (Rotten Tomatoes gives it 77%), However, Martha Nussbaum subsequently complained in The Point magazine, that although Examined Life displays "a keen visual imagination and a vivid sense of atmosphere and place" it nonetheless "presents a portrait of philosophy that is... a betrayal of the tradition of philosophizing that began, in Europe, with the life of Socrates".

See also
Žižek!
Derrida
Waking Life
 The Ister

References

External links
 
 
 Examined Life at the National Film Board of Canada
 Kam Williams], Examined Life review

2008 films
English-language Canadian films
2008 documentary films
Canadian documentary films
Documentary films about philosophers
Films set in Toronto
National Film Board of Canada documentaries
Documentary films about Slavoj Žižek
Films about philosophy
2000s English-language films
2000s Canadian films